Charles Robert Barry QC, PC (3 January 1823 – 15 May 1897) was an Irish politician and lawyer who rose to become a Lord Justice of Appeal for Ireland.

Legal and judicial career
He was born in Limerick, a son of James Barry, solicitor, and educated at Dalton's School, Limerick, Midleton College, County Cork, and Trinity College Dublin, and admitted to Lincoln's Inn.

Barry was admitted to the Irish Bar in 1848 and was appointed Queen's Counsel in 1859. He was Member of Parliament for Dungarvan from 1865 to 1868, He was appointed Law Adviser to the Lord Lieutenant of Ireland in 1865, and was made Third Serjeant-at-law (Ireland) in 1866. He served as Solicitor-General for Ireland from 1868 to 1870, and as such prosecuted the Fenians in 1868. From 1870 to 1872 he was Attorney-General for Ireland. In 1872 Barry was appointed a Justice of the Queen's Bench and from 1883 to 1897 served as Lord Justice of the Irish Court of Appeal. Elrington Ball attributed his rise not only to his extraordinary legal ability, but also his immense personal popularity.

Personal life

Barry married Kate, daughter of David and Catherine Fitzgerald of Dublin and sister of John David Fitzgerald, who became MP for Ennis and also a Justice of the Queen's Bench and later a Lord of Appeal in Ordinary. Sources are contradictory as to their children; some report only one son, Charles junior; others report another son, James David Barry. According to Thom's Directory, James David Barry J.P., was a soldier who served with the Royal Horse Artillery and was Aide-de-camp to Lords-Lieutenant of Ireland. Having been decorated for his service in the Boer War, he embarked with 1st Expeditionary Force in August 1914 with the rank of Major. His wife Florence was the daughter of the 4th Baron Clanmorris. The Major and his wife are buried at St Mary's church, Clonsilla, Fingal.

Kate's sister Emily married Denis Caulfield Heron, who like Barry held office as both Law Adviser to the Lord Lieutenant and Serjeant-at-law.

Notes

References
 Obituary in the New York Times, 16 May 1897
New Lord Justice for Ireland, New York Times 16 June 1897
Anthony David Edwards, The role of international exhibitions in Britain, 1850-1910 from Google Books

External links 
 

1825 births
1897 deaths
Members of the Parliament of the United Kingdom for County Waterford constituencies (1801–1922)
Solicitors-General for Ireland
Attorneys-General for Ireland
Lords Justice of Appeal for Ireland
Irish barristers
Members of the Privy Council of Ireland
UK MPs 1865–1868
Alumni of Trinity College Dublin
Members of Lincoln's Inn
Judges of the High Court of Justice in Ireland
Serjeants-at-law (Ireland)
19th-century Irish judges
19th-century Irish lawyers
Irish Queen's Counsel
People educated at Midleton College